ZNW-FM is a radio station in Nassau, Bahamas broadcasting a religious format to the southern Bahamas.  It is an affiliate of 3ABN Radio and LifeTalk Radio.  The station first aired on March 31, 2012 with help from LifeTalk Radio in Fort Worth, Texas.

External links 
 

Radio stations in the Bahamas
Seventh-day Adventist media
Radio stations established in 2012
Three Angels Broadcasting Network radio stations